Gavbar-e Sofla (also Romanized as Gāvbār-e Soflá and Gav Bar Sofla; also known as Gāvbar-e Pā’īn, Gāvbār-e Pā’īn, and Gāvbor-e Pā’īn) is a village in Japelaq-e Sharqi Rural District, Japelaq District, Azna County, Lorestan Province, Iran. At the 2006 census, its population was 349, in 84 families.

References 

Towns and villages in Azna County